CyclingPlus is a road cycling sport magazine owned by Immediate Media Company. First published in 1992, there are 13 issues a year.  The magazine contains product reviews and reports on rides around the UK, and is reminiscent of Bicycling magazine of the 1970s in the USA. It is (as of 2017) edited by Rob Spedding with the majority of the readers being in their mid forties, and has a circulation of 44,000.

References

External links
CyclingPlus website

1992 establishments in the United Kingdom
Cycling magazines published in the United Kingdom
Magazines established in 1992
Mass media in Bristol
Monthly magazines published in the United Kingdom